Stephen Allen Craig (born 1955) is a Canadian politician, who was elected to the Nova Scotia House of Assembly in a by-election on June 18, 2019. A member of the Progressive Conservatives, he represents the electoral district of Sackville-Cobequid.

Craig had previously sat on Halifax Regional Council, representing Lower Sackville since the 2012 Halifax Regional Municipality municipal election.

Political career
On August 31, 2021, Craig was made Minister of Fisheries and Aquaculture.

Personal life
Craig and his wife Shari live in Lower Sackville. They have two children, Marlo and Jonathan.

Electoral record

District 15, Halifax Municipal Election 2012: Lower Sackville

|-
 
|New Democratic Party
|Dave Wilson
|align="right"|4,477
|align="right"|54.50
|align="right"|+9.12
|-
 
|Progressive Conservative
|Steve Craig
|align="right"|2,499
|align="right"|30.42
|align="right"|+2.05
|-
 
|Liberal
|David Major
|align="right"|1,051
|align="right"|12.80
|align="right"|-12.31
|-

|}

References

Living people
Progressive Conservative Association of Nova Scotia MLAs
Members of the Executive Council of Nova Scotia
Halifax Regional Municipality councillors
1955 births